Rock Ridge Public Schools is a school district based in Virginia, Minnesota and Eveleth, Minnesota. It is assigned the designation of Independent School District (ISD) 2909 by the State of Minnesota.

Ground was broken for the new Rock Ridge High School on August 5, 2020. It is set to open in the fall of 2023. Rock Ridge Superintendent Noel Schmidt claims this new school will be the most impressive school north of St. Cloud. The mascot for the district is a Wolverine.

High schools
Virginia High School (Virginia) serves grades 7-12.
Eveleth-Gilbert High School (Eveleth) serves grades 7-12.

Elementary schools
Parkview Elementary (Virginia) serves preK-2.
Laurentian Elementary (Eveleth) serves grades preK-6.
North Star Elementary (Eveleth) serves grades 3-6. North Star is housed in the former Benjamin Franklin Elementary while the new North Star is being constructed on the site of Roosevelt Elementary in Virginia.

Administration

 Superintendent - Dr. Noel Schmidt
 Principal (Eveleth HS Campus) - Todd Griepentrog  
 Principal (Virginia HS Campus) - Mark Winter
 Principal (Parkview) - Sheena Stefanich
 Principal (North Star Elementary) - Scott Manni 
 Principle (Laurentian Elementary) - Angie Williams 
 Dean of students (Eveleth Campus) - Nicole Young

Sports

 All Eveleth-Gilbert & Virginia sports teams will be combined by the opening of the new Rock Ridge High School. As of Summer 2021 Track, Swimming, Tennis, Girls' Golf, and Girls' Hockey are already combined. Boys' Hockey, Football, Cross Country, and Dance will all be combined before that point. A new ice arena in Virginia Iron Trail Motors Event Center, which opened in September 2021, will be the home of the combined hockey team.
 The Eveleth Hippodrome, known as "The Hipp," is Minnesota's oldest hockey arena still in use. The facility hosted its first hockey game on New Year's Day 1922. The Hipp has birthed careers of hockey luminaries like Frank Brimsek, John Mariucci and John Mayasich. The 2017-2020 period found standout Elliot Van Orsdel scoring 85 points through his high-school career, a memorable latter-day success story from the Hipp. The Hipp, owned and operated by the City of Eveleth, will continue to be the home ice for the E-G youth hockey program.
 Athletic Directors are Chad Hazelton for Eveleth-Gilbert & Josh Lamppa for Virginia.

Boys' Hockey 

Virginia and Eveleth both have a rich hockey heritage dating to the turn of the Twentieth Century. Before consolidation, the Golden Bears & Blue Devils were regular and spirited Iron Range Conference and MSHSL Section 7A rivals. The January 2020 Virginia/MIB vs. Eveleth-Gilbert game was one of the most-viewed hockey games on the Iron Range. The Eveleth Hippodrome was at full capacity and over 3,000 people had viewed the game. The game  was also the occasion of the unveiling of the Rock Ridge moniker, logo, and hockey jerseys. 

The last hockey game played in Virginia's Miners Memorial arena before its demolition also ended up being the final matchup between the two teams before their merger. At the time of the game, a Section 7A quarterfinal matchup played in front of a pandemic-limited crowd and many others viewing online on March 20, 2021, fans believed the two teams would have one more independent season, but subsequently the Rock Ridge school board voted on May 10, 2021 to make the consolidation effective in the 2021-2022 season.  The program will be a cooperative that also includes the adjacent Mountain Iron-Buhl and Mesabi East school districts.

Coaches

Eveleth-Gilbert 2020-2021 Season Coaches 

 Jeff Torrel - Head
 Paul Coombe - Assistant
 Jared Anderson - Assistant
 Steve Troutwine - Assistant

Virginia-MIB 2020-2021 Season Coaches 

 Cale Finseth - Head
 Evan Friedlieb - Assistant
 Chris Westin - Assistant

Rock Ridge 2021-2022 Season Coaches 

 Ben Johnson - Head

Essentia Health All-Star Game 
The first Essentia Health All-Star Boys' Hockey Game, featuring standouts from across the Arrowhead region, was played at the end of the season in 2020. Players from both Eveleth-Gilbert and Virginia/MIB played in the game including Elliot Van Orsdel, Will Troutwine, Nick Beaudette, and Gage Everson from Eveleth-Gilbert, and Ryan Scherf from Virginia/MIB. Jeff Torrel from Eveleth-Gilbert was the head coach for the White Team. In 2021 from Eveleth-Gilbert Brandon Lind, Kolton Bajda, and Nick Troutwine were selected. From Virginia/MIB Ian Kangas, Ryan Scherf, and Tom Nemanich made the team. The White Team was coached by Jeff Torrel, Paul Coombe, and Jared Anderson, all from Eveleth-Gilbert. Rock Ridge had their first ever season in 2022, and had four players selected: Dylan Hedley, Keegan Ruedebusch, Brennan Peterson, and Nick Troutwine. The blue team was coached by Ben Johnson, Ryan Cobby, and Evan Friedlieb, all from Rock Ridge.

References

External links
 Rock Ridge Public Schools

School districts in Minnesota
Education in St. Louis County, Minnesota
Educational institutions established in 2020
2020 establishments in Minnesota